Jia Dao (779–843), courtesy name Langxian, was a Chinese Buddhist monk and poet active during the Tang dynasty.

Biography 
Jia Dao was born near modern Beijing; after a period as a Buddhist monk, he went to Chang'an. He became one of Han Yu's disciples, but failed the jinshi exam several times. He wrote both discursive gushi and lyric jintishi. His works were criticised as "thin" by Su Shi, and some other commentators have considered them limited and artificial.

According to Dr. James J.Y. Liu (1926–1986), a professor of Chinese and comparative literature, Jia's poem "The Swordsman" "seems...to sum up the spirit of knight errantry in four lines." "The Swordsman" reads in Liu's translation as follows:

A metric translation of the original Chinese poem with one iamb per Chinese character reads as follows:

See also
Classical Chinese poetry
Han Yu
Li He
Luoyang
Meng Jiao
Tang poetry

References

Sources
Pine, Red, and Mike O'Connor. The clouds should know me by now: Buddhist poet monks of China. Boston: Wisdom Publications, 1999. Includes selection of dual-language poems.

External links 
 
Books of the Quan Tangshi that include collected poems of Jia Dao at the Chinese Text Project:
Book 571
Book 572
Book 573
Book 574

779 births
843 deaths
8th-century Chinese poets
9th-century Chinese poets
Poets from Hebei
Tang dynasty Buddhist monks
Three Hundred Tang Poems poets
Writers from Baoding